East Springfield is a hamlet in the town of Springfield, Otsego County, New York, United States. The zipcode is: 13333. According to the 2010 US census, The location of East Springfield had a population of 62.

Notes

Hamlets in Otsego County, New York
Hamlets in New York (state)